Agila Subic Multi-Use Facilities (also known as Agila Subic Shipyard; formerly the Hanjin Subic Shipyard) are a shipyard in Subic, Zambales, Philippines. It is located along the coastline of the Redondo Peninsula in Sitio Agusuhin.

It was formerly owned and operated by shipbuilding firm Hanjin Heavy Industries and Construction Philippines.

History

As Hanjin Subic Shipyard

The Subic Shipyard was built by Hanjin Heavy Industries and Construction Philippines (HHIC–Phil), a subsidiary of the South Korean firm Hanjin Heavy Industries. HHIC–Phil received its first order to build a ship at the Subic Shipyard in 2006. Construction of the shipyard began in early 2006 and its facilities were complete by 2009. The first ship built at the Subic Freeport Zone, the MV Argolikos, was inaugurated at the Hanji Subic Shipyard in July 2008, in a ceremony attended by then President Gloria Macapagal Arroyo. The ship was also the Philippine-made container ship.

By 2015, the Hanjin Subic Shipyard became one of the top ten top 10 shipbuilders in the world in terms of orderbook. At one point, the Philippines is the fifth largest shipbuilding nation in the world, largely owing to the output of the Subic shipyard. At its peak in 2016, the shipyard employed 35,000 people.

Riddled with debt, HHIC–Phil filed for voluntary rehabilitation under Republic Act 10142, otherwise known as "An Act Providing for the Rehabilitation or Liquidation of Financially Distressed Enterprises and Individuals" on January 8, 2019 and laid off 10,000 of its employees retaining only 300 employees in the shipyard by January 2020.

Agila Subic
Australian shipbuilder Austal and US-based Cerberus Capital Management has considered launching a joint bid to takeover the Subic shipyard. Austal would later drop its bid to have a stake in the shipyard.

Agila Subic became Cerberus' new partner, taking over the operations of the shipyard in March 2022. Agila Subic is a Dutch venture consisting of four companies that are affiliates of Cerberus.  Accordingly the shipyard was renamed as the Agila Subic Multi-Use Facilities.

The Philippine Navy began leasing the shipyard's the northern yard in May 2022. American defense contractor Vectrus would also move in.

Cerberus completed its acquisition of the shipyard by April 2022.

Facilities
The Hanjin Subic Shipyard covers an area of  within the Subic Freeport Zone. As of 2015, it has a  dock, gantry cranes and an automated assembly line with 600,000 deadweight tonnage (DWT) of annual shipbuilding capacity.

Philippine Navy base

The Philippine Navy occupies the northern yard of the shipyard. The portion is referred to as Naval Operating Base (NOB) Subic. The navy has previously considered turning the shipyard into a submarine base.

References

Shipyards of the Philippines
Buildings and structures in Zambales
Military facilities in Zambales